Behavioral Ecology and Sociobiology is a peer-reviewed scientific journal covering quantitative, empirical, and theoretical studies in the field of analysis of animal behavior at the levels of the individual, population, and community.

Abstracting and indexing
The journal is abstracted and indexed in:

According to the Journal Citation Reports, the journal has a 2020 impact factor of 2.980.

References

External links

Ecology journals
Ethology journals
Publications established in 1976
Springer Science+Business Media academic journals
Monthly journals
English-language journals